Force Troops Command was a combat support and combat service support command of the British Army. Its headquarters was at Upavon, Wiltshire. It was formed in 2013 as a re-designation of the previous Headquarters Theatre Troops. Force Troops Command was renamed as 6th (United Kingdom) Division in August 2019.

History
Previously, General Officer Commanding, Theatre Troops was a senior British Army officer responsible for the provision of Combat Support and Combat Service Support operations worldwide in support of the UK's Defence Strategy. There were two logistic brigades 102 Logistic Brigade in Germany and 101 Logistic Brigade in the United Kingdom which contained logistic units to support the two deployable divisions (1st Armoured Division in Germany and 3rd Mechanised Division in the United Kingdom). Additionally 104th Logistic Support Brigade operates the specialist units needed to deploy a force overseas such as pioneers, movements and port units.

Theatre Troops became Force Troops Command under Army 2020 in 2013 and reached Full Operating Capability (FOC) on 1 April 2014. 101 or 102 Logistic Brigades subsequently left Force Troops Command.

The Joint Ground-Based Air Defence Command, which was jointly controlled by RAF Air Command, was replaced by 7 Air Defence Group on 1 April 2019.

Force Troops Command was renamed as 6th (United Kingdom) Division on 1 August 2019, with sub-units consisting of 1st Signal Brigade, 11th Signal Brigade, 1st Intelligence Surveillance and Reconnaissance Brigade, 77th Brigade and the Specialised Infantry Group. It will sit alongside restructured 1st UK Division and 3rd UK Division.

Structure

Formation

Largest 
Force Troops Command comprised nine ‘functional’ brigades. The various units included: The Intelligence and Surveillance Brigade which provided integrated intelligence surveillance and reconnaissance capabilities, drawing specifically on lessons from Afghanistan.  1st Artillery Brigade delivered both close support artillery and precision fires, as well as leading Air-Land Integration. 8 Engineer Brigade commanded the close support engineer units, as well as Explosive Ordnance Disposal and Search, Force Support and Infrastructure Groups. The 77th Brigade was involved in conflict prevention and stabilisation through the projection of soft power.

Commanders
Commanders have included:
General Officer Commanding, Theatre Troops
2001–2004 Major General James Shaw
2004–2006 Major General Tim Cross    
2006–2008 Major General Hamish Rollo    
2008–2011 Major General Bruce Brealey
2011–2013 Major General Shaun Burley
General Officer Commanding, Force Troops Command
2013–2015 Major General Tim Radford
2015–2017 Major General Tyrone Urch
2017–2019 Major General Thomas Copinger-Symes
July 2019–August 2019 Major General James Bowder

Footnotes

References

External links
6th (United Kingdom) Division

Commands of the British Army
Military units and formations established in 2013
Organisations based in Wiltshire
Army 2020